is a Japanese manga series written and illustrated by Hiroyuki Asada. The series was first serialized in Shueisha's shōnen manga magazine Monthly Shōnen Jump from 2006 to 2007, and then transferred to Jump Square, where it ran from 2007 to 2015. It chapters were collected in twenty tankōbon. Set in a fictional land illuminated by an artificial sun, it follows Lag Seeing, a Letter Bee with the ability to see the memories of people and items, and his personal dingo Niche on their journeys across AmberGround.

Tegami Bachi was adapted into an anime television series by Pierrot+, which aired for two seasons from October 2009 to March 2011. At the 2010 Comic-Con International, Viz Media announced that it acquired the license for Tegami Bachi in North America. The company serialized the manga in the North American Shonen Jump magazine from March 2009 to March 2010. It is currently releasing the English version of the manga in the tankōbon format, with all 20 volumes released by 2017. Both seasons of the anime have been licensed by Sentai Filmworks.

Plot
The story takes place in AmberGround, a land of perpetual night only partly illuminated by an artificial sun. Lag Seeing is a newly minted delivery boy, called a "Letter Bee", who worked at the Bee Hive delivery service with his Dingo, Niche, and her "pet", Steak, travelling with him. As a Letter Bee, Lag's job is to deliver letters and packages from town to town while avoiding AmberGround's deadliest hazard—Gaichuu, giant armoured insects who attempt to feed off the "heart" that reside within these letters and packages.

When Lag was very young, his mother was kidnapped by men from AmberGround's capital of Akatsuki. He was sent as a "delivery" to his aunt thanks to Gauche Suede, who Lag started to idolize and was inspired to become a Letter Bee. But as Lag becomes a Letter Bee, he is informed that Gauche has disappeared; at the same time, a resistance movement called "Reverse" begins stealing letters from travelling Bees.

Lag later encounters Gauche, who appears to have no memory of his past, and is now devoted to Reverse's cause. In desperation, Lag vainly tries to make Gauche remember. At the same time, Gauche awakens a giant flying Gaichuu that is headed for the town Yuusari, the location of the Bee Hive; and later Akatsuki to destroy AmberGround's man-made sun.

Characters

A 12-year-old boy with a very focused mindset, regardless of what situations he gets into and always focuses on delivering the package. He was also born on the day of the Flicker. He's very emotional and is nearly constantly crying. He has a special gun called the Shindanjuu, literally the "heart bullet gun" where he loads a "fragment of heart" into the gun, then fires Akabari (Red Needle) at the target. He is seemingly able to control the direction of the shot. His spirit amber visualizes memories of an animated object. As a child, he was "delivered" by the letter bee Gauche Suede, and was inspired by him to become a letter bee. He is searching for his mother, who was kidnapped to the capital of the country. His left eye is made of red spirit amber, allowing him to better use the Shindanjuu and also allowing him to fire a heart bullet from his own body. He originally has an antique from Campbell, though he receives the Nocturne #20, Gauche's gun. In chapter 29, after Sunny lost her heart to a Gaichuu, Lag's body glowed like spirit amber as he fired a special letter bullet at Noir (Gauche) in hopes of restoring his heart. His name is derived from "lagrima", a Spanish word for "tears", "rag", "Lú"/"Lugh", the name of the Celtic god of the sun of the Danann family, and "seeing", the measure of sight.
His "Dingo" is Niche, a girl he saved from a Gaichuu (armored insect) who decided to stay at his side when he said yes to her asking him if saying goodbye would make him sad after seeing his memories via the Shindanjuu.

Lag's personal Girl Without a Smile. She travels with Lag, acting as his bodyguard against Gaichuu, and sticks closely to Lag along with her "pet", "Steak", on her head. She battles using her hair, also known as "The Golden Sword", manipulating it into powerful blade-like tentacles capable of lifting things several times her size. She has bearlike forearms and claws which she usually keeps covered with oven mitt-like gloves. Niche displays animal-like characteristics, such as licking wounds and sniffing the air for any trace of danger. She dislikes wearing underwear, but wears them for Lag's sake, claiming that he is the first person to ever make her wear underwear. The sister refers to Niche as "imouto" (younger sister). Her name is derived from "niche", a crevice or narrow space to put flowers as an offering to the Holy Mother.
Lag found Niche at a train station on his way to his Bee Interview. She was a "letter", but the address on her mailing label was incomplete and she was scheduled to be "abandoned" in two more days. Lag offered to take her to her new home ("" according to the mailing label in the local writing, which he thought was an orphanage) even though he was on a deadline for his Bee job interview. While traveling, Lag found she had multiple names, so he named her Niche after where he found her—in a niche at the station.
Lag hurried back to Love Someone Down with the excuse that Niche's delivery receipt had not been signed. When he got there he found that Niche had already wrecked the sideshow tent with her "Golden Sword" and gone on the run towards Gaichuu territory. He followed her and consequently saved her from a Gaichuu. She decided to stay with Lag after he explained that her address had become unknown (since she had destroyed the mailing label), and she insisted that from then on she would be Lag's "Dingo".

Lag's rescuer, who first appears in chapter 1. He is the letter bee that finds young Lag Seeing marked as a letter in "Cosa Bell", a small town in the "Yodaka District" (The low class district in Amberground). He has to deliver to "Campbell Litus" a town also in the "Yodaka District" so he can join his aunt who was trusted to take care of him from the person who wrote Lag's letter data. Gauche is also a caring and enthusiastic letter bee, he is trying to become the "Head Bee" (Captain of the letter bees) so he has enough money to help his sister and live peacefully. In Chapter 7 it is revealed that Gauche is no longer a Letter Bee. Gauche later appears before Lag and steals the letter he is delivering. He refers to himself as a Marauder known as Noir (meaning "Black/Dark" in french) and appears to have no memories of Lag or being a Bee, possibly having lost that part of his heart. His personality greatly differs from the time he was Gauche: as Noir, he is usually expressionless, although it is shown that he deeply cares for Roda and will do everything to protect her. Later on, a Marauder is explained to be a "Plunderer" who takes on the job of theft. Marauders mainly target Letter Bees to keep them from delivering their letters. His name is derived from Gauche the Cellist. In chapter 30, Lag fires a letter bullet through Gauche in hopes to bring back Gauche's memories, which leaves him comatose til chapter 38. Later, it is revealed that this partially failed, as it only gives Gauche the memories Lag had of him, rather than restoring his own.
It is revealed in Chapter 10 by Aria Link that Gauche's sister Sylvette was born on the Day of Flicker. He'd gone to the Hill of Prayer to pray for his mother and sister when Sylvette was born. The Day of Flicker (romanised as "The day of blink" in Japanese media) was the day when the government went out for an investigation and a modification of the manmade sun. His mother died after Sylvette was born. Subconsciously, Aria says that to fill the void in his heart left by the missing shards of his memories of his mother, he started focusing all his attention on making Sylvette happy.
Gauche's Spirit Amber attack is called Kurobari (Black Needle). During his time as a Letter Bee he owned the Nocturne #20, but his current Shindanjuu is Gymnopédie that uses the attack Raven Black.

Gauche's younger, paraplegic sister. Born on the Day of Flicker, like Lag. Her brother left her to go to Akatsuki, and eventually disappeared. When she would meet Lag, years later, she had claimed to have given up on Gauche being alive. She later learns he is alive, and Lag promises to find him. After the encounter with Noir outside Honey Waters, when Lag returns home, Sylvette throws him a party because he had found Gauche, as promised. She rents Gauche's room to Lag, Niche, and Steak, and she makes Dolls to cover the rent and expenses. Lag thinks her soup is as terrible as "The Three Brothers' Soup" Gauche had brought with him on his journey; Zazie sympathizes with him on this.
At the end of the story, Sylvette's heart is taken by the sun. However, Lag gets it back. By this point, both are in love with each other.
 (dog)
Gauche's "Dingo". She is a skillful dog that seems to be very well trained for fighting and tracking situations. She appears to be a skilled hunter as well.
 (human)

A child that was given to Gauche as an assistant from the leader of Reverse. Gauche subconsciously named her after his former Dingo.
She is also from Reverse for she was an experiment and many species/creatures were mixed with her but the experiment failed, thus throwing her out, then found by Lawrence. She told Lag about this and said that maybe one of the creatures mixed in her is the former dingo of Gauche/Noir.

Steak is Niche's live bait and emergency food supply. He followed her from the LOVE SOMEONE DOWN's sideshow after she destroyed it. He is usually seen traveling on her head, very rarely moving from his perch even while she is battling Gaichuu. He has the ability to sniff out the weak spots of Gaichuu, allowing Lag to fire his Shindanjuu at the weak spot, killing the armored insect. Steak is also known to bite people on the head, his whole body represents that of a mouth.
Niche has remarked that Steak would taste delicious (hence his name). Steak seems to have accepted his fate as a future meal and appears to have meekly submitted to Niche's (interrupted) attempts to cook him. But in all the attempts to cook him, he only got his hair done.
Steak may be the last of the Kapellmeister, a species that once co-existed harmoniously with the Spirit Insects, and was thought to be extinct.

A young Letter Bee who was first seen in chapter 2, escorting Lag to his Bee job interview. Connor made regular deliveries to Campbell Litus as Lag was growing up, and seems to be popular with the townspeople. He has a hearty appetite and a stocky build, and tires easily. His Dingo is a hound dog named , who is skilled at tunneling. He fell in love with Sunny, a young girl from an abbey in Lamento Town, not knowing she and all in her abbey were members of Reverse. When she, along with all other members of her abbey, lost her heart to the massive Cabernet Gaichuu, lost control and furiously tried to attack the Gaichuu, but eventually ran out of heart and passed out. As of the latest chapter, he remains in Lamento Town with the comatose Sunny, still believing she will regain her heart one day.Later in the series it is revealed that Sunny didn't lose all her heart and becomes Connor's girlfriend
Connor's Spirit Amber attack is called "Heart Landmine", or 'Kibaku', Yellow Bomb, which he executes by setting shards of his "Appetite" on the ground and igniting them under the Gaichuu.

The Master of the "Bee Hive". Largo tends to have a more invested interest in Lag and his deliveries, though the reason for this is unknown. He later joins Reverse revolutionary group, having been a test subject just they have been. Unlike the Man Who Couldn't Become a Spirit, Largo has a better plan for overthrowing the government.

The Sub Master of the "Bee Hive". Aria acts as Largo's right hand, taking care of the minor things for him. She was earlier introduced in the series in Gauche's memories as a letter bee and Gauche's love interest.
Aria's Spirit Amber ability is the Heart Restoration Bullet, which she executes by playing music on her violin. The music has a healing effect on everyone who hears it. The closer one stands to her while she is playing, the stronger the healing effects.
Aria's Spirit Amber attack is called "Benihiiro no Senritsu" (Crimson Melody), which is ejected from her violin.

Lag's aunt who lives in "Campbell Litus" and was trusted with Lag's care since he was delivered to her at the age of 7 by "Gauche Suede" the letter bee. When Lag learns about his origins as a fragment of heart, Sabrina is revealed to be his real aunt, but a good friend of his mother, the current Empress.
Dr. Thunderland Jr.

A biologist who belongs to the Third Bioscience advisory panel of Amberground division. He specializes in pathology and collects corpses for dissection and study, earning him the nickname "The Corpse Doctor." He has a morbid interest in dissection. Nonetheless he has a kind heart, and makes a star-shaped memorial for each corpse he dissects. Zazie hated him at one point, because he thought Thunderland had taken a group of street kittens Zazie liked, however, it was shown he only quarantined them.
Dr. Thunderland Jr. is also one of the five survivors of the airship that crashed on the Day of Flicker due to the blindness of the light going out.

Zazie is a young Letter Bee who was introduced in chapter seven. He is very skilled at killing Gaichuu. Zazie's parents were killed by Gaichuu when he was young, leading him to become a Letter Bee so that he could seek revenge against all Gaichuu. Because he is so focused on killing Gaichuu, delivering Letters is of course of little interest to Zazie. Zazie is very fond of cats. At one point, he was mad at Dr. Thunderland because he thought that the Doctor killed an alley cat he was feeding. However, when he found that Dr. Thunderland quarantined the cat because of a disease, Zazie forgave him.
Zazie is also quite fond of Jiggy Pepper, and looks up to him as, in a sense, 'his idol.' A minor reference to that is at the end of Chapter 20, when Lag is telling Zazie (and Conner, who happen to be at Sylvette's) about what had happened, and Zazie yelling in disbelief that he really rode Jiggy's Bike. He then goes on to questioning every detail, with a hint of jealousy in the comic panel that it's explained in. There's also been a four-strip comic in which Zazie questions Jiggy's pay, and finds that he plans to be an express deliverer like Jiggy. Lastly, in chapter 43, Zazie wakes to find himself on Jiggy's bike, and, while combating the Cabernet Gaichuu, he claims that he'd 'rather die' than back down when Jiggy speaks of the risks.
Zazie's Spirit Amber attack is called Aotoge (Blue Thorn), which uses shards of his "Malice" instead of his heart.

Zazie's Dingo, which takes the form of a black panther. It has stuck with Zazie since it was a kitten, being fond of its owner.

A semi-recurring Bee, whose Shindanjuu is his motorcycle. He was first mentioned in chapter three by his adopted sister, Nelli. Nelli hated him because she blamed the death of her brother Nello on his leaving them. When Lag shot off a heart bullet at Nello's letter, it was revealed he wanted to get stronger for Nelli. Jiggy later appeared saving Lag from a giant Gaichuu that had trapped him in a trance. He said he had received a letter from his sister Nelli, telling him about Lag's efforts, and thanked him, before departing. He later appears due to a request from Largo and says that he follows who he wants to follow and no one else. Largo then gives him a wounded Zazie to take care of and they leave pursuing the Gaichuu heading towards the capital. Zazie worships him as a hero. His Dingo is a hawk named Harry.
Jiggy's spirit amber is Gunjou, Sea Blue Ultramarine, which he executes through a Shindanjuu he carries besides his motorcycle.

Lag's mother. She was kidnapped to the capital of the AmberGround, Akatsuki at the start of this manga. She is later revealed to have been from the royal bloodline, and is now part of the machine continuing to keep the man-made sun lit. During the Day of Flicker, a fragment of heart hit her, causing an accelerated pregnancy within minutes. What was born was a boy being of pure heart; to keep him from fading, Anne had Sabrina Mary place a Spirit Amber in his eye socket. This gave the boy human form, and Anne named him Lag.

He is the leader of the Reverse society to plunder the letters that Letter Bees delivered. He, while Gauche no longer remembers his past, gives him name as Noir, the Marauder.

Media

Manga

Written and illustrated by Hiroyuki Asada, Tegami Bachi debuted in Shueisha's Monthly Shōnen Jump on September 6, 2006. The magazine ceased its publication on June 6, 2007. Following a special un-numbered one-shot chapter published in Weekly Shōnen Jump on October 15, 2007, the series was transferred to the then brand new magazine Jump Square on November 2 of the same year, where it ran until its conclusion on November 4, 2015. Shueisha collected its chapters in twenty tankōbon volumes, released from January 4, 2007, to January 4, 2016.

Viz Media announced that it had licensed Tegami Bachi for an English-language adaption in North America at the Comic-Con International on February 28, 2010. It was announced that Tegami Bachi, otherwise known as Letter Bee in English translations, will be serialized in the monthly manga anthology Shonen Jump, where it replaced the manga series Slam Dunk. It debuted in the March 2009 issue of the magazine.

Drama CD
A drama CD, which adapted the Jiggy Pepper arc, was released on February 16, 2009.

Anime

A special anime adaptation, running for about 30 minutes, was shown during the Jump Super Anime Tour events in Japan in the fall of 2008. It was titled , and was animated by Pierrot+. The Original Video Animation was translated for free by Anthony Carl Kimm on the Jumpland website with English subtitles. It was later released on DVD in the beginning of 2009.

In the June 2009 issue of the Jump SQ magazine, it was announced that Tegami Bachi will get an anime series in the fall of 2009. This anime series is directed by Akira Iwanaga, and it features the same voice cast which had voiced characters in the previous 2008 special anime. This anime started airing in Japan on the TV Tokyo, TV Osaka, TV Aichi and other affiliated television networks around Japan on October 3, 2009, and it ended on March 27, 2010. The first opening theme song for this anime was revealed to be the song , which is sung by Suga Shikao and features Mummy-D, on September 7, 2009. This theme song was replaced by the song , which is sung by singer Seira, in episode 14 of the anime onwards. In 2013, Animax Asia re-aired Tegami Bachi in English, under the title Letter Bee.

A second season of the anime, called Tegami Bachi REVERSE was announced in the Puff magazine in Japan during an interview with the artist. This season of the anime retained its previous voice cast, and is also directed by Akira Iwanaga. The second season of the anime premiered on October 1, 2010.

Reception

Manga
Deb Aoki of About.com reviewed Tegami Bachi Volume 1. Aoki said that the series "has the right stuff to appeal to both male and female readers: thrilling action, a magical world full of mysteries, likeable characters that are worth caring about, and lovely artwork, all done with a touch of light-hearted humor."

In Japan, volume 2 of the manga debuted at the 6th position during the first week of its release.

Anime
Carlo Santos of Anime News Network reviewed the first 6 episodes of Tegami Bachi. He commented that the series "may be one of the last few adventure series that is genuinely about adventure" and "an adventure with a unique vibe". Santos went on to say how the series as a whole isn't like typical adventure series, which deal with "the triumphs and tragedies of having the best sword", as it is built on "the triumphs and tragedies of the human heart". A negative point he said was about the animation—describing the Gaichuu as "plastic-looking CGI beasts looking woefully out of place among the scenery". However, Santos complimented the series' art direction by saying that "the artistry is far more commendable: the blend of feudal and industrial eras results in a unique visual aesthetic". Overall, Santos gave a positive review of the first 6 episodes of Tegami Bachi with an overall grade of B−.

References

External links

  
 Shueisha Tegami Bachi official website 
 Hiroyuki Asada's blog 
 PSP game website 
 

2006 manga
2009 anime television series debuts
2010 anime OVAs
2010 anime television series debuts
Adventure anime and manga
Orphans in fiction
Studio Signpost
Science fantasy anime and manga
Sentai Filmworks
Shōnen manga
Shueisha franchises
Shueisha manga
Steampunk anime and manga
TV Tokyo original programming
Viz Media manga